Aaron Read is a Canadian actor and stand-up comedian from Burnaby, British Columbia. He is most noted for his performance in the 2018 film When the Storm Fades, for which he won the Vancouver Film Critics Circle award for Best Supporting Actor in a Canadian Film at the Vancouver Film Critics Circle Awards 2018.

In 2020 he was featured in the CBC Gem stand-up comedy series The New Wave of Standup.

Filmography

Film

Television

References

21st-century Canadian male actors
21st-century Canadian comedians
Canadian male film actors
Canadian male comedians
Canadian stand-up comedians
Male actors from British Columbia
Comedians from British Columbia
People from Burnaby
Living people
Year of birth missing (living people)